Werauhia hygrometrica is a species of flowering plant in the Bromeliaceae family. It is native to Costa Rica, Mexico, Venezuela and Ecuador.

References

hygrometrica
Flora of Costa Rica
Flora of Mexico
Flora of Venezuela
Flora of Ecuador
Taxa named by Édouard André